Ihite is a village in southeastern Nigeria. It is located near the city of Owerri in Imo State.

Villages in Igboland
Towns in Imo State